Green List (LV), also The Greens–Green List (LV–LV), was a Spanish party alliance in the European Parliament election and general election in 1989. It was composed by most members from the 1987 Confederation of the Greens but Green Alternative–Ecologist Movement of Catalonia, as well as The Greens.

Member parties
The Greens (LV)
The Alternative Greens (LVA)
Ecologist Party of the Basque Country (PEE)
Ecologist Alternative of Galicia (AEG)

References

Defunct political party alliances in Spain
Green political parties